Kidero can mean

 Kidero (rural locality), a rural locality in Dagestan, Russia
 Evans Kidero, a Kenyan politician